Kotlenik (Serbian Cyrillic: Котленик) is a mountain in central Serbia, near the town of Kraljevo. Its highest peak Veliki vrh has an elevation of 749 meters above sea level.

References

External links 
Biking tour over Kotlenik, Staze i Bogaze.

Mountains of Serbia
Rhodope mountain range